The Laureus World Sports Award for Team of the Year is an award honouring the achievements of those teams who have demonstrated "supreme performance" in the world of sports. It was first awarded in 2000 as one of the seven constituent awards presented during the Laureus World Sports Awards. The awards are presented by the Laureus Sport for Good Foundation, a global organisation involved in more than 150 charity projects supporting 500,000 young people. The first ceremony was held on 25 May 2000 in Monte Carlo, at which Nelson Mandela gave the keynote speech. , a shortlist of six nominees for the award comes from a panel composed of the "world's leading sports editors, writers and broadcasters". The Laureus World Sports Academy then selects the winner who is presented with a Laureus statuette, created by Cartier, at an annual awards ceremony held in various locations around the world. The awards are considered highly prestigious and are frequently referred to as the sporting equivalent of "Oscars".

The inaugural winner of the award was English football team Manchester United, who had completed an "historic treble" by winning the UEFA Champions League, the Premier League and the FA Cup during the 1998–99 season. Football teams, including both domestic and international sides, have won more awards than any other sport with eleven, followed by rugby union (four) and Formula One teams (three). Teams from Germany and France have won the award three times, while teams from England, Spain, and South Africa have won it twice. The 2021 winner of the Laureus World Sports Award for Team of the Year was Bayern Munich.

List of winners and nominees

References

Team of the Year
Awards established in 2000